Spurwinkia is a genus of very small aquatic snails, operculate gastropod mollusks in the family Cochliopidae.

Species
Species within the genus Spurwinkia include:
Spurwinkia salsa (Pilsbry, 1905)

References

Cochliopidae
Monotypic gastropod genera